Velika Kladuša (lit. "Great Kladuša") is a town and municipality located in Una-Sana Canton of the Federation of Bosnia and Herzegovina, an entity of Bosnia and Herzegovina. It is situated in the far northwest of Bosnia and Herzegovina, located near the border with Croatia. As of 2013, it has a population of 40,419 inhabitants.

History

Velika Kladuša was first mentioned by name on October 30, 1280 (date on its shield) by the name Cladosa under the rule of King Ladislaus IV of Hungary. During the era of Byzantine Empire it is assumed that the population of the town started to slowly grow. Towards the end of the 13th century up to 1464, Velika Kladuša was controlled by Croatian noble families of Babonić, Frankopan, Šubić and Tuz de Lak.

Around 1464 the Ottoman Empire was expanding towards this region. It was raided in 1558. The town was finally captured in 1633 by the Ottoman Empire. After the Ottoman conquest, Islamization of the hitherto Christian region began and much of the local population converted to Islam. Velika Kladuša would later become the center of Ottoman expansion into neighboring Croatia as well as the rest of Europe. At the start of the occupation of Bosnia and Herzegovina by the Austro-Hungarian Empire in 1878, Velika Kladuša along with others in the region, put up the biggest resistance in the region. Nevertheless, it developed with the opening of schools, the introduction of land register books, and a mosque and a catholic church were built.

World War II and socialist Yugoslavia
During World War II the region of Velika Kladuša fought on the side of the Yugoslav Partisans. At one point the town switched alliances and allowed the Nazis to occupy it but this was planned out with the Partisans because they then surprised the Nazis by jointly attacking them with the Partisans. The people in this region were always strong supporters of Yugoslav President Josip Broz Tito and communism. One café in Velika Kladuša was named "Tito" in his honor.

In May 1950, Velika Kladuša was the scene of a major peasant revolt when the Cazin uprising, an armed anti-state rebellion, occurred. The event most affected neighboring Cazin, as well as Slunj, which were all part of Communist Yugoslavia at the time. The peasants revolted against the forced collectivization and collective farms by the Yugoslav government on the farmers of its country. Following a drought in 1949, the peasants of Yugoslavia were unable to meet unrealistic quotas set by their government and were punished. The revolt that followed the drought resulted in the killings and persecution of those who organized the uprising, but also many innocent civilians. It was the only peasant rebellion in the history of Cold War Europe.

Agrokomerc 
In era of Yugoslav socialism the town became the headquarters of Agrokomerc, one of the biggest food companies in the Socialist Federal Republic of Yugoslavia. The company started as a single food producing farm and grew to an estimated 13,000 employees at its peak of production. Agrokomerc turned Velika Kladuša and the surrounding regions from one of the poorest in Yugoslavia to one of the richest. Velika Kladuša was at one point called "the Switzerland of Yugoslavia" due to its small size but great wealth. At other points it was called "the Cayman Islands of the Balkans".

Yugoslav Wars and the post-war years 
During the war in Yugoslavia, Agrokomerc still continued to operate as it produced all types of food bound for Zagreb, Belgrade and other places. Agrokomerc worked with international companies as far away as Ecuador, Colombia, Germany and Brazil. Today Agrokomerc still works but at a smaller capacity than before the war.  It is often changing directors and is currently without one. During the Bosnian War (1992–1995), the town was the capital of the self-declared Autonomous Province of Western Bosnia. The seat of the government was at the Stari Grad Castle, which had defense forces guarding it throughout the day and night. The city itself did not suffer much damage as it was mostly spared of large fighting. Following the end of the Bosnian War, the town was the home of the Czech helicopter unit and Canadian Forces NATO camp supporting the IFOR and SFOR peacemaking missions from 1995 to 2004.

Demographics

2013
According to the 2013 census the municipality of Velika Kladuša had 40,419 residents, including:
32,561 Bosniaks (98.07%)
636 Croats  (1.57%)
146 Serbs (0.36%)

Religion
According to the 2013 census the religious makeup of Velika Kladuša includes:
32,561 Islam (98.07%)
636 Catholic  (1.57%)
146 Orthodox (0.36%)

Sports
Local football club Krajišnik have spent a few seasons in the second tier of Bosnia and Herzegovina's football pyramid.

Notable people 
 Baggio Husidić, footballer
 Husein Miljković, military
 Fikret Abdić, former president, mayor

See also
Bosanska Krajina

References

External links

 Official site

 
Populated places in Velika Kladuša
Bosnia and Herzegovina–Croatia border crossings